Mohammad Syuhiran bin Zainal (born 24 January 1993) is a Malaysian footballer who plays for PDRM as a defender.

References

External links
 

1993 births
Living people
Malaysian footballers
Terengganu F.C. II players
Association football defenders